James Redmond may refer to:

James Redmond (actor) (born 1971), British actor
James Redmond (broadcaster) (1918–1999), British engineer and broadcasting pioneer
James R. Redmond, professor of zoology